Milan Knežević (Serbian Cyrillic: Милан Кнежевић; born 24 March 1980) is a Montenegrin politician and poet who is the founder and current president of the right-wing Democratic People's Party, a member of presidency of the opposition Democratic Front alliance and current Мember of the Parliament of Montenegro as well as the President of the Parliamentary Board for Defence and Security.

Biography

Private life
He was born to a Serb family in 1980 in Titograd (Podgorica). Having finished elementary and secondary school in Podgorica, Knežević graduated Serbian language and South Slavic literature at the Faculty of Philosophy in Nikšić. He is fluent in Serbian, English and Russian language.

On 13 November 2020, it was announced that Knežević contracted COVID-19.

Political life
He decided to enter political life in the mid 2000s by joining Srđan Milić's Socialist People's Party (SNP), in which he was one of the representatives in the parliament of Montenegro. Before the 2012 parliamentary election right-wing faction of the SNP led by Knežević and their former president Predrag Bulatović left the party and join Democratic Front (DF) alliance independently. 

After the election Knežević remains a representative in the assembly. In November 2015, he was elected President of the newly formed populist Democratic People's Party (DNP).

Involvement in alleged coup d'état

On 15 February 2017, Milan Knežević was stripped of his parliamentary immunity in connection with an ongoing criminal prosecution against him. On 8 June 2017, the High Court in Podgorica confirmed the indictment of Milan Knežević, along with thirteen other persons, including two Russian nationals and Andrija Mandić, on charges that included "preparing a conspiracy against the constitutional order and the security of Montenegro" and an "attempted terrorist act."

On 18 October 2017, Knezevic has been sentenced to seven months in prison, for attacking a policeman on 17 October 2015 in front of the Parliament building, during the Democratic Front protests. After being found guilty Knezevic said that the verdict was an indicator of trapped state institutions, particularly judicial ones. He added he was not afraid and said he would continue his political struggle. He also announced he would appeal against the court's judgement.

References

1980 births
Living people
Politicians from Podgorica
Socialist People's Party of Montenegro politicians
Members of the Parliament of Montenegro
People from Podgorica
Serbs of Montenegro
Montenegrin poets
Montenegrin male writers